Tajik Canadians are Canadian citizens of Tajik descent. According to the 2011 Census there were 2,400 Canadians who claimed Tajik ancestry. Presently in the province of Quebec there are living around 500 families of Tajiks from Tajikistan, Afghanistan, Uzbekistan, Russia, Israel, etc. They reside in Montreal (more than 250 families), Quebec City, Sherbrooke and Granby cities (30 families). More than 500 Tajik families are living in the Toronto area. Only 250 families of Tajik Bukharian Jews reside in Forest Hill in Toronto. Around 200 Tajik families are living in the Calgary area and the city of Vancouver.

History of immigration to Canada
The first wave of Tajik immigration to Canada started in the 1970s during the Cold War. There have been from the former Soviet Union. There were not a big number of immigrants. Among them have been some representatives of Tajikistani community: Tajiks, Bukharian Jews (Tajik Jews), Russian speaker Tajikistanis.

The second wave of Tajik immigrants came to Canada during the 1980s, after the Soviet invasion of Afghanistan and the time of Perestroyka of Gorbachev. Tajiks from Tajikistan, Uzbekistan and particularly from Afghanistan moved to Canada.

The third stage of Tajik immigration to Canada started in 1992, when the civil war broke out in the new independent country of Tajikistan. That process has beef up after the Taliban radical movement seized power in Afghanistan (1996), anti-Tajik hatred policy of Taliban regime forced thousands of Tajik people to leave Afghanistan for Canada.

The fourth wave of Tajik immigration has begun since the first decade of the year of 2000. Nowadays, Tajik people from Tajikistan, Afghanistan, Uzbekistan, Israel, and Russia have been entering Canada.

Notable Tajiks in Canada
 Sarfaroz Niyozov
Moses Znaimer
Alexander Sodiqov

See also 

Middle Eastern Canadians
West Asian Canadians

References 

Ethnic groups in Canada
Asian Canadian
Canada
Canadian people of Tajik descent
 
West Asian Canadians